Yolanda de la Torre Valdez (born 6 April 1964) is a Mexican politician from the Institutional Revolutionary Party. From 2009 to 2012 she served as Deputy of the LXI Legislature of the Mexican Congress representing Durango.

References

1964 births
Living people
Politicians from Durango
Women members of the Chamber of Deputies (Mexico)
Institutional Revolutionary Party politicians
Politicians with disabilities
21st-century Mexican politicians
21st-century Mexican women politicians
Members of the Constituent Assembly of Mexico City
Deputies of the LXI Legislature of Mexico
Members of the Chamber of Deputies (Mexico) for Durango
Members of the Senate of the Republic (Mexico) for Durango
Women members of the Senate of the Republic (Mexico)